Wysox Township may refer to the following townships in the United States:

 Wysox Township, Carroll County, Illinois
 Wysox Township, Bradford County, Pennsylvania